In politics, a war hawk, or simply hawk, is someone who favors war or continuing to escalate an existing conflict as opposed to other solutions. War hawks are the opposite of doves. The terms are derived by analogy with the birds of the same name: hawks are predators that attack and eat other animals, whereas doves mostly eat seeds and fruit and are historically a symbol of peace.

Historical group

The term "war hawk" was coined in 1792 and was often used to ridicule politicians who favored a pro-war policy in peacetime. Historian Donald R. Hickey found 129 uses of the term in American newspapers before late 1811, mostly from Federalists warning against Democratic-Republican foreign policy. Some antiwar Democratic-Republicans used it, such as  Virginia Congressman John Randolph of Roanoke.  There was never any "official" roster of War Hawks; as Hickey notes, "Scholars differ over who (if anyone) ought to be classified as a War Hawk." However, most historians use the term to describe about one or two dozen members of the Twelfth Congress. The leader of this faction was Speaker of the House Henry Clay of Kentucky. John C. Calhoun of South Carolina was another notable War Hawk. Both of these men became major players in American politics for decades, despite failing to win the presidency themselves. Other men traditionally identified as War Hawks include Richard Mentor Johnson of Kentucky, William Lowndes of South Carolina, Langdon Cheves of South Carolina, Felix Grundy of Tennessee, and William W. Bibb of Georgia.

President James Madison set the legislative agenda for Congress, providing committees in the House of Representatives with policy recommendations to be introduced as bills on the House floor. Nevertheless, he was regarded as a "timid soul" and tried to restrain the martial zeal of the War Hawks.

Variations of the term
The term has also been expanded into "chicken hawk", referring to a war hawk who avoided military service. 

The term "liberal hawk" is a derivation of the traditional phrase, in the sense that it denotes an individual with "socially liberal" inclinations coupled with an aggressive outlook on foreign policy.

In modern American usage "hawk" refers to a fierce advocate for a cause or policy, such as "deficit hawk" or "privacy hawk". It may also refer to a person or political leader who favors a strong or aggressive military policy, though not necessarily outright war.

See also

 Animal epithet
 Warmonger (disambiguation)
 War dove

References

Political terminology of the United States
Defunct American political movements
War of 1812
Metaphors referring to birds
People associated with war